Kim Jae-yong (born February 13, 1994) is a South Korean actor, singer and model. He is a former member of HALO. He is best known for his supporting roles in The Miracle We Met, Fists of Legend and Love with Flaws as Joo Seo-joon.

Discography

Filmography

Film

Television series

Web series

Television show

References

External links 
 
 

1994 births
Living people
21st-century South Korean male actors
South Korean male models
South Korean male television actors
South Korean male film actors
South Korean male idols
South Korean male singers
South Korean pop singers